Orobó is a municipality/city in the state of Pernambuco in Brazil. The population in 2020 was 23,935 inhabitants and the total area is 138.66 km2. The city has the best children's mortality rate of the state (2.9) and one of the best in the whole country.

Geography

 State - Pernambuco
 Region - Agreste of Pernambuco
 Boundaries - Paraiba state   (N);  Bom Jardim   (S);  Machados and São Vicente Ferrer   (E);   Casinhas   (W).
 Area - 140.78 km2
 Elevation - 415 m
 Hydrography - Goiana River
 Vegetation - Caducifólia and Subcaducifólia forests
 Climate  -  Tropical hot and humid
 Annual average temperature - 25.0 c
 Distance to Recife - 127.4 km

Economy

The main economic activities in Orobó are related with  commerce and agribusiness, especially creations of cattle, goats, pigs, chickens; and plantations of bananas and sugarcane.

Economic Indicators

Economy by Sector
2006

Health Indicators

References

Municipalities in Pernambuco